This is a list of neighbourhoods in Calgary, Alberta.

As of 2016, Calgary has 197 neighbourhoods, which are referred to as "communities" by the municipal government, and 42 industrial areas. A further 15 communities were included in the civic censuses from 2015 to 2019, bringing the total to 212. Calgary Open Data also confirms six more communities yet to be developed (Alpine Park, Ambleton, Glacier Ridge, Lewisburg, TwinHills, and Symons Valley Ranch).



Centre City 
The area collectively known as the Centre City comprises Downtown (including the Downtown West End and Downtown East Village) and the adjacent neighbourhoods of Eau Claire, Chinatown, and the Beltline (including Connaught and Victoria Park). 

Within Centre City, those neighbourhoods below that have an area redevelopment plan (ARP) in effect are indicated with "ARP" in parentheses.

Downtown 
Downtown Calgary is bordered by 11th Street W. on the west, 3rd Avenue S. and the Bow River on the north, the Elbow River on the east and the CPR mainline tracks on the south.

Downtown neighbourhoods:
 Downtown West End
 Downtown Commercial Core
 Downtown East Village
Unofficial districts:
 Stephen Avenue Retail Core
 Entertainment District
 Government District

Other 
The remaining Centre City neighbourhoods are predominantly residential and mixed-use. These areas are often considered to be an extension of downtown. Other Centre City neighbourhoods include:
 Beltline — is physically separated from downtown proper by the CPR mainline tracks, and is the densest and most populous neighbourhood in Calgary. It comprises the former neighbourhoods of Connaught on the west and Victoria Park on the east.
 Chinatown
 Eau Claire

Inner city 
The inner city includes Downtown Calgary and the adjoining communities, and overlays roughly the city limits before 1961. It is delimited by Sarcee Trail to the west; Glenmore Reservoir and Glenmore Trail to the south; Bow River and Deerfoot Trail to the east; and Bow River and 32 Avenue to the north.

The inner city includes the following neighbourhoods (by city quadrant):

Quadrants 
Calgary is divided into four geographic quadrants generally described below.
Northwest Calgary – west of a combination of Centre Street/Harvest Hills Boulevard and north of a combination of the Bow River, Sarcee Trail and Highway 1 (Trans-Canada Highway)
Northeast Calgary – east of a combination of Centre Street//Harvest Hills Boulevard and north of a combination of the Bow River, a Canadian Pacific rail line, Centre Avenue and Memorial Drive
Southwest Calgary – south of a combination of the Bow River, Sarcee Trail and Highway 1 (Trans-Canada Highway) and west of a combination of Centre Street, a Canadian Pacific rail line, Macleod Trail and Sheriff King Street
Southeast Calgary – south of a combination of the Bow River, a Canadian Pacific rail line, Centre Avenue and Memorial Drive and east of a combination of Centre Street, a Canadian Pacific rail line, Macleod Trail and Sheriff King Street

List 
The following is a list of all neighbourhoods within the City of Calgary including residential communities, industrial areas, major parks and residual areas by electoral ward.

Business Improvement Areas 
Calgary's Business Improvement Areas (BIA; formerly Business Revitalization Zones or BRZ) are business districts established by businesses within an area to jointly raise and administer funds for various projects and promotional activities within that zone throughout the year. BIAs in Calgary are established for one or more of the following purposes: "improving, beautifying and maintaining property" in the BIA; "developing, improving and maintaining public parking;" and/or promoting the BIA as a business or shopping area.

The BRZ program in Calgary was established in 1983 to allow certain commercial areas of the city to administer and promote themselves internally. Many of the zones that emerged from this have since acquired a virtual "neighbourhood" status by the people of Calgary. (None of these zones are officially designated as neighbourhoods unto themselves, however.)

These are the 15 Business Improvement Areas of Calgary :

 17th Ave Retail & Entertainment District
 4th Street South West BIA (located mostly within Mission)
 Beltline BIA
 Bridgeland BIA
 Calgary Downtown Association
 Chinatown BIA
 Crescent Heights Village BIA
 Greenview Industrial BIA (formerly HIPville BIA)
 Inglewood
 International Avenue
 Kensington BIA
 Mainstreet Bowness BIA
 Marda Loop BIA
 Montgomery on the Bow BIA
 Victoria Park BIA

Industrial areas 
Most industrial areas are located between Deerfoot Trail and 36 Street East in the northern half of the city; between Macleod Trail, Deerfoot Trail and Glenmore Trail in the south and east of Barlow Trail in the southeast.

Gallery

See also
Calgary (main article)
List of neighbourhoods in Edmonton

References

External links 
 Calgary Official Community Map
 Calgary Area - List of Communities and Community Associations 
 City of Calgary - Community profiles

 
Neighbourhoods
Calgary

ms:Senarai kawasan kejiranan Ottawa